Vladimir Ivanov (born 10 April 1987) is an Estonian tennis player.

Ivanov has a career high ATP singles ranking of 310 achieved on 27 July 2015. He also has a career high ATP doubles ranking of 408, achieved on 10 December 2018. Ivanov has won 7 ITF singles titles and 15 doubles titles.

Despite relative success on the ITF Futures Tour, Ivanov has struggled at higher levels, only reaching one ATP Challenger Tour Semi-Final. This came in 2015 in Tampere, Finland, where he was defeated 4-6 3-6 by Andre Ghem.

Ivanov has represented Estonia at Davis Cup, in Davis Cup he has a win–loss record of 25–15.

Future and Challenger finals

Singles: 22 (7–15)

Doubles: 42 (15–27)

References

External links
 
 
 

1987 births
Estonian male tennis players
Living people
Sportspeople from Tallinn
Estonian people of Russian descent
21st-century Estonian people